Sungai Besi may refer to:
Sungai Besi
Sungai Besi (federal constituency), formerly represented in the Dewan Rakyat (1974–95)